Gregory Sun (born 10 August 1962) is a Trinidad and Tobago bobsledder. He competed at the 1994, 1998 and the 2002 Winter Olympics. In his first and third Olympic appearances, Sun was the flag bearer for Trinidad and Tobago.

References

External links
 

1962 births
Living people
Trinidad and Tobago male bobsledders
Olympic bobsledders of Trinidad and Tobago
Bobsledders at the 1994 Winter Olympics
Bobsledders at the 1998 Winter Olympics
Bobsledders at the 2002 Winter Olympics
Sportspeople from Port of Spain